The Lee University Campus Choir is a worship choir associated with Lee University in Cleveland, Tennessee.

History 
In Cleveland, Tennessee, the Church of God started the Bible Training School which later became Lee College and is now Lee University. This higher education institution sponsored "The Church of God Hour" on the local radio stations and featured a 40 voice mixed choir, which has had several directors, including Harold Cato, Y.H. Yates, and Roosevelt Miller.

In 1958, A.T. Humphries divided the Mixed Choir into two distinct organizations – a touring choir and the Campus Choir.

Dr. David Horton was appointed as the director of Campus Choir in 1983. Starting with 58 students, the choir grew into an enrollment of 150 students. The decision was made to begin auditions and to limit the size of the choir to around 100 students, and the choir would begin to travel to local churches and sing an arrangement of choral music. Another influence at this time was the creation of Choral Union with the purpose of performing the great oratorios. Years later, Dr. Horton decided to make worship the main focus of the Lee University Campus Choir, and remains the focus of the choir to this day.

With several releases to their name, The Comforter Has Come was the final project under the direction of Dr. Horton, who had been director for 25 years until his death in 2006. Since his death, the choir has been directed by Dr. Mark Bailey and Pastor Jimmy Phillips, respectfully. The leadership has now been passed to Dr. Luke Gambill since the resignation of Phillips in September 2020.

Directors 
 A.T. Humphries (1958–1963)
 Dr. Delton Alfrord (1963–1967)
 Dr. Jim Burns (1967–1973)
 Jerry Long (1973–1974)
 Dr. Jim Burns (1974–1978)
 Dr. David Horton (1978–1980)
 Dr. Phillip Thomas (1980–1983)
 Dr. David Horton (1983–2006)
 Dr. Mark Bailey (2006–2007)
 Jimmy Phillips (2007–2020)
 Dr. Luke Gambill (2020-)

Performances 
Campus Choir has performed with gospel musicians such as The Crabb Family, Jason Crabb, Mark Harris, Michael English, The Katinas, Natalie Grant, Joy Gardner, Alvin Slaughter, Ron Kenoly, Phil Driscoll, Geron Davis and Kindred Souls, and Judy Jacobs.

Travel
Campus Choir has traveled around the United States and across the world leading worship to thousands of people. The choir has had the opportunity to sing at some of the leading churches in the U.S., including Times Square Church with Pastor David Wilkerson, Christ Church, Carpenter's Home Church in Lakeland, Florida, Omega Center International with Perry Stone in Cleveland, Tennessee, and Dwelling Place International with Judy Jacobs.

Many notable places Campus Choir has traveled to include Israel, Bulgaria, Ireland, England, Ecuador, and Guatemala. The choir has also been involved with The Inspiration Networks and Trinity Broadcasting Network.

Recordings

Audio 
Premier Edition
Sing Noel
Power Unlimited
Let the Church Rise
Live From Bulgaria
Gabriel's Song
Revive Us Again (with Alvin Slaughter)
Sing Out (with Ron Kenoly)
Tree of Light
Praise, Worship, and Glory
God's Glorious Church
Joy
Jubilee
Through the Fire
Live in Worship
Lord You're Holy
Times of Refreshing
The Comforter Has Come
Can't Stop Praising Him
Exceedingly, Abundantly
Raise Our Hallelujahs (Fall 2020 EP)
O Come, All Ye Faithful (Fall 2020 Single)

Video 
Let the Church Arise
Live from Bulgaria
Gabriel’s Song
Sing Out with One Voice
Praise, Worship and Glory
Jubilee!
Live In Worship
The Comforter Has Come
"Lord You're Holy"
Oh Come, All Ye Faithful (single)

References

External links 
 Campus Choir Facebook
 Campus Choir Alumni Site

University choirs
American choirs
Lee University
Musical groups established in 1958
1958 establishments in Tennessee